is a railway station on the Toyama Chihō Railway Kamidaki Line in the city of Toyama, Toyama Prefecture, Japan, operated by the private railway operator Toyama Chihō Railway.

Lines

Station layout 
The station has one ground-level side platform serving a single bi-directional track. The station is unattended.

Adjacent stations

History
Kaihotsu Station opened on 25 April 1921.

Surrounding area 
Toyama Agricultural Engineering Center

See also
 List of railway stations in Japan

External links

  

Railway stations in Toyama Prefecture
Railway stations in Japan opened in 1921
Stations of Toyama Chihō Railway